Penelope Trunk (born Adrienne Roston; legal name Adrienne Greenheart; pen name "Adrienne Eisen" December 10, 1966) is an American writer and entrepreneur. 

Trunk co-founded four venture-backed Internet startups, and TechCruch named Trunk, along with Susan Wojcicki, Sheryl Sandberg, and Marissa Mayer, on the list of 30 most influential women in the tech industry.

Early life
Trunk grew up in Wilmette, Illinois, until she was 14 and the police removed her from her parent's house. Then she lived with her grandparents in Glencoe and attended New Trier High School. She graduated from Brandeis University, before moving to Los Angeles to pursue a career as a professional beach volleyball player. On the Women’s Professional Beach Volleyball Tour she was ranked 17th in the US.

Career

Hypertext
Trunk published Six Sex Scenes in 1996. In 1998 Trunk won the New Media Invision Award for Digital Storytelling. As part of the hypertext canon, Six Sex Scenes influenced other writers in terms of structure and content.

Journalism
Trunk began writing business advice when Fortune magazine published an open call for a woman to write about her own life as an executive and Trunk won the job. She has been a columnist at Business 2.0 magazine, Bankrate.com, Yahoo! Finance. and The Boston Globe. Her blog posts were syndicated to more than 200 newspapers.

Books
In 2001 Trunk published Making Scenes with Alt-X (a subsidiary of University of Colorado), which is a book based on pages previously published on her website. Andrew Stern wrote that it was a publishing experiment of going from nonlinear format to linear instead of the other way around. Making Scenes was republished by Emily Books in 2012. Trunk's second book, Brazen Careerist: The New Rules for Success, was published by Warner Books.

Entrepreneurship

Trunk worked for ten years as a marketing executive in the software industry. During this time, she founded the companies math.com and eCityDeals which were both acquired. Trunk has written about her career in Time and The Guardian.

She co-founded Brazen Careerist and it became a social network for generation Y to get jobs from their blogs. The company would later focus on virtual career events instead, having failed to draw millennials from LinkedIn. 

Trunk tried reality TV and making goat cheese which failed. So she became a career coach. While living on the farm Trunk co-founded Quistic, an online learning company.

Personal life 
Trunk married Nino in New York City and had two children. The family moved to Madison, Wisconsin in 2006, before relocating to a farm near Darlington, Wisconsin.

Trunk filed for divorce. The New York Times interviewed parenting experts who warned Trunk to stop blogging about her divorce. Trunk did not stop.

Trunk has two sons by her first husband. After she and her first husband divorced, Trunk married her second husband, a farmer. Trunk's accounts of physical abuse in the relationship with her current husband have been discussed on the feminist website Jezebel. In September 2009, Trunk was preparing to have an abortion, but while waiting out a state legal requirement, she suffered a miscarriage during a company board meeting. Her Tweets about the incident received widespread media attention. It was around this time, Marin Cogan recalled in an article for The Cut, that Trunk's blog began to take on a darker tone, less appealing than the one that had made her the "Sheryl Sandberg long before Sandberg wrote Lean In". Cogan came to feel she and other early career women had been "mistaken in assuming that Trunk’s brazen careerism was a feminist project in any meaningful sense." 

Trunk describes herself as having Asperger syndrome after deciding many criteria for the disorder applied to her.

Bibliography 
Hypertexts
 Six Sex Scenes (Alt-X, 1993)
 What Fits: A Hypertext Novela (Eastgate Reading Room, 1994)
 Considering a Baby (Iowa Review, 2001)
Books
 "Making Scenes" (as Adrienne Eisen) (Broadvision, April 2001)
 Brazen Careerist: The New Rules for Success (Warner, May 2007)
 The New American Dream: A Blueprint for a New Path to Success (Hyperink, July 2012)
 The Power of Mentors: The Guide to Finding and Learning from Your Ideal Mentor (Hyperink, October 2012)

References

External links 
 Official personal website

1966 births
21st-century American non-fiction writers
American bloggers
American business writers
Women business writers
American women in business
Brandeis University alumni
Living people
New Trier High School alumni
People from Darlington, Wisconsin
People from Wilmette, Illinois
21st-century American women writers
American women non-fiction writers
American women bloggers